Thanh Miện is a township and capital of Thanh Miện District, Hải Dương Province, Vietnam.

References

Populated places in Hải Dương province
District capitals in Vietnam
Townships in Vietnam